The Kadohadacho (Caddo: Kadawdáachuh) are a Native American tribe within the Caddo Confederacy. Today they are enrolled in the Caddo Nation of Oklahoma.

History
The Kadohadacho traditionally lived at the borders of Texas, Oklahoma, Arkansas, and Louisiana. They cultivated crops, such as corn, beans, squash, and pecans, and manufactured bows and pottery for trade.

Traveling parties of Kadohadacho encountered the Hernando De Soto expedition in 1541, but the Spaniards did not enter their territory. In 1687, the tribe welcomed the survivors of the La Salle expedition into their villages in Texas. From that point onward, the Kadohadacho maintained friendly relations with the French.

In the 17th and 18th centuries, they were one of three clusters of Caddo tribes. Their group consisted of four communities settled near the Great Bend of the Red River.

During the early 18th century, they were attacked and many were either slain or enslaved by the Chickasaw. Some remnants of the tribe fled west and joined the Nassoni and the Caddoan-speaking Natchitoches. By the late 18th century, the remaining Kadohadacho joined their Nachitoches relatives in northwestern Louisiana.

Removal
In 1845 the US federal government removed both the Kadohadacho and the Hasinai to the Brazos Reservation in Texas. In 1859, these tribes were again removed, with other Caddo tribes, to Indian Territory on a reservation located between the Canadian and Washita Rivers.

Today
The Kadohadacho are enrolled members of the Caddo Nation of Oklahoma, headquartered in Binger, Oklahoma, along with the Hasinai, the Hainai, and other Caddo tribes. The Kadohadacho dialect of the Caddo language, closely related to the Hasinai and Natchitoche dialects, is still spoken today.

Notes

References
 Edmonds, Randlett. Nusht'uhtitiʔ Hasinay: Caddo Phrasebook. Richardson, TX: Various Indian Peoples Publishing, 2003. .
 Sturtevant, William C., general editor and Raymond D. Fogelson, volume editor. Handbook of North American Indians: Southeast. Volume 14. Washington DC: Smithsonian Institution, 2004. .
 Lauber, Almon Wheeler. Indian Slavery in Colonial Times Within the Present Limits of the United States. New York: AMS Press, 1969. (originally published by Columbia University Press, 1913)

External links
 Caddo Nation of Oklahoma
 Kadohadacho article from the Oklahoma Historical Society

Caddoan peoples
Native American tribes in Arkansas
Native American tribes in Louisiana
Native American tribes in Oklahoma
Native American tribes in Texas